This Is Your Sword may refer to:

"This Is Your Sword", a song by Bruce Springsteen on his 2014 album High Hopes
"This Is Your Sword", a 2015 episode of Arrow